Mamdapur is a village in Rahata taluka of Ahmednagar district in the Indian state of Maharashtra.

Population
As per the 2011 Census, the population of the village is 5,782; of which 3,038 are males and 2,744 are females.

Economy
Agriculture is the main occupation of the village.

Transport

Road
The Shrirampur-Sangamner highway passes through the village.

Rail
Shrirampur railway station is the nearest railway station to the village.

Air
Shirdi Airport is the nearest airport to the village.

See also
List of villages in Rahata taluka

References 

Villages in Ahmednagar district